General Fellows may refer to:

John Fellows (brigadier general) (1735–1808), Massachusetts Militia brigadier general in the American Revolutionary War
Richard W. Fellows (1914–1998), U.S. Air Force brigadier general

See also
Attorney General Fellows (disambiguation)